Lucille Hewitt is a fictional character from the British soap opera Coronation Street, played by Jennifer Moss. Created by Tony Warren as one of Coronation Street's original characters, at eleven years old Lucille was the show's only child character upon its inception and first appeared in the episode broadcast on 21 December 1960.

Daughter of widowed bus conductor Harry Hewitt (Ivan Beavis), Lucille spent several years in an orphanage in her youth, but occasionally visited her father. When Harry married again in 1961, this time to barmaid Concepta Riley (Doreen Keogh), Lucille was able to return home but took an instant disliking to her stepmother. The following year, Concepta gave birth to a half-brother for Lucille, Christopher Hewitt (Stephen Ward). When Christopher was kidnapped while in his sister's care, Lucille received the blame, which strengthened the hatred between Lucille and Concepta. In 1964, Harry and Concepta moved to Ireland alongside Christopher; however, Lucille refused to follow them, and ended up being fostered by local landlords Jack (Arthur Leslie) and Annie Walker (Doris Speed).

Both of Lucille's father figures died in the years that followed, with Harry being crushed to death in 1967 and Jack suffering a heart-attack in 1970. Another loss for Lucille came when she was jilted by her fiancée Gordon Clegg (Bill Kenwright), and Lucille longed to escape Annie's strictly-run household. Over the years, Lucille and Concepta mended their relationship, and in 1974 Lucille joined her and Christopher in Ireland, never to return.

Storylines
Lucille runs away from the orphanage in December 1960 and finds her way back home. Her father, Harry Hewitt (Ivan Beavis), gives in to her pleas and arranges for her to stay for the holidays. Ultimately, Lucille is allowed to return permanently from the orphanage when her aunt, Alice Burgess (Avis Bunnage), agrees to move in to look after her niece while her father is away working. However, the pair did not get on, and Alice's stay was a short one.

Harry married barmaid Concepta Riley (Doreen Keogh) in 1961, and the pair had a baby boy Christopher Hewitt (Stephen Ward) on 6 August the following year. Lucille was initially jealous of the baby because of the attention he got, and did not like the adjustments she had to make to accommodate the new arrival. She felt second-best to Christopher, and that she was losing the father who adored her to his new family.

Lucille briefly ran away from home, but was persuaded to return by Ena Sharples (Violet Carson). When she returned, the Hewitts planned a party to celebrate Harry and Concepta's first anniversary. Whilst Christopher was in Lucille's care, she went away for a moment, and when she returned, he was gone. Lucille was suspected by the police of having an active part in Christopher's disappearance because of her jealousy towards him. Christopher was later found, having been kidnapped by Joan Akers (Anna Cropper).

Concepta was always wanting Harry to move the family to Ireland; in 1963, Harry conceded and for a moment the family looked set to leave Weatherfield. Lucille begged her father to change his mind, and only the issue of Lucille's schooling made him decide to stay. A year later, Concepta pressed Harry on the issue again, and this time he obliged. Lucille, however, was adamant that she was staying in Weatherfield to finish her exams. She moved in with Jack (Arthur Leslie) and Annie Walker (Doris Speed) in the Rovers Return. At one point, Concepta asked Lucille to consider moving to Ireland until she turned 21, but Harry was fine with her staying behind.

Unfortunately, later that day Harry was crushed to death while repairing a car. Lucille consequently stayed in Ireland for a while with Concepta. Upon her return, she fell in love with Gordon Clegg (Bill Kenwright. Tired of their parents' interference, the couple attempted to elope to Gretna Green, but missed their train. The marriage was cancelled at the last minute when Gordon jilted Lucille and left to work in London as an accountant. In 1974, Gordon returned for Maggie Clegg (Irene Sutcliffe)'s wedding. To avoid seeing him, Lucille went to Ireland to visit her stepmother and half-brother. She never returned to Weatherfield.

Development

Creation
One of Coronation Street'''s original characters conceived by Tony Warren, the character of Lucille existed as far back as the initial conception of the show, when Coronation Street was known as Florizel Street, although at this time she was named Janice. Jennifer Moss made her debut as Lucille in the second dry run, alongside her onscreen father Harry Hewitt (Ivan Beavis). Due to being four foot eleven, Moss could pass for eleven years old, though she was nearly sixteen when Coronation Street premiered on 9 December 1960. In her early years, Lucille was portrayed as an impressionable young schoolgirl who had a difficult relationship with her stepmother, Concepta Riley (Doreen Keogh). Four years older than her character, Moss related to the troubles Lucille went through as she got older: "If you're a teenager, a teenage rebel is quite easy to play because we've all gone through sort of the stroppy bit."

As she was a minor when the programme first started, Moss's appearances were initially restricted. This was explained by Lucille living in an orphanage following the death of her mother. She made 29 appearances in 1961, up to November of that year, when the Equity actors' strike began, leaving Moss unable to sign a new contract until industrial action ended the following April. During this absence, Lucille was still living at 7 Coronation Street and would be mentioned occasionally to keep her alive in viewers' minds. Lucille was the first regular character to return after the strike was over, re-appearing in Episode 142 on 23 April 1962.

Personal problems and ultimate firing
Moss successfully battled alcoholism in the 1980s, which was the reason underlying her being sacked from Coronation Street for bad behaviour by then-producer Susi Hush in 1974. Moss stated that she drank to numb the pain she felt after the death of her father, Reg. In an interview with the Evening Times'' in 1979, Moss, then living in a three-apartment house in Wigan, found for her by the local Social Works Department when she was homeless, Moss said: "My youngest daughter, Sarah, is only three years old and is mentally handicapped... while I was pregnant I was drinking all the time. I will go to my grave with this damage to my child on my conscience." Her eldest daughter, Naomi (like Sarah) was taken into care, and her baby boy had died when he was three days old in 1976.

References

Coronation Street characters
Television characters introduced in 1960
Female characters in television
Child characters in television